

The Aero Boero AB-180 is an Argentine civil utility aircraft, a substantially improved development of the AB-95. It featured a more powerful engine and incorporated the aerodynamic changes made on the AB-115 and improved on them. The first example flew in 1967 and was in production until 2000.

Variants
AB-180RV – long-range version
AB-180RVR – glider tug
AB-180 Condor – high-altitude version of 1971 with optional turbocharger (4 built)
AB-180Ag – agricultural aircraft with 270 L (66 US gal) belly tank for chemicals
AB-180SP – 180Ag with an additional set of short wings to make a sesquiplane. In this variant, the agricultural application liquid is carried within the short wings, rather than in a belly tank. The added wings allow a fully loaded stall speed of 56 km/hr (35 mph), compared to 89 km/hr (55 mph) in the AB-180Ag.
AB-180PSA – two-seat primary training aircraft

Operators

Argentine Air Force
Club de Planeadores Rosario

Specifications (AB-180RVR)

See also

References
notes

Bibliography
Lambert, Mark. Jane's All The World's Aircraft 1993–94. Coulsdon, UK:Jane's Data Division, 1993. .

External links

 Specs & Photo at Flugzeuginfo.net

Aero Boero aircraft
1960s Argentine civil utility aircraft
Single-engined tractor aircraft
High-wing aircraft
Aircraft first flown in 1967